Anthony Joseph Pratt (born 11 April 1960 in Melbourne, Victoria), an Australian businessman and billionaire, is the Executive Chairman of Visy Industries and Pratt Industries in America, the world's largest privately owned packaging and paper company. He is the son of the late Richard Pratt, a former manufacturing magnate and former president of the Carlton Football Club; and Jeanne Pratt , a philanthropist.

According to The Australian rich list Pratt and his family have a net worth of A$27.7 billion. Forbes assessed his net worth in 2022 at US$12 billion; listing his sisters' wealth independently.

Early life and education
Pratt was born in Melbourne, Victoria to Richard Pratt (né Przecicki) and Jeanne Pratt , both Polish-Jewish immigrants. He graduated from Monash University, Melbourne, with a Bachelor of Economics (Hons) in 1982.

Career

Pratt joined McKinsey & Co, a management consulting firm, in 1982 before joining Visy as joint General Manager of its board. In 1988, he became Deputy Chairman of Visy Industries. Three years later, he moved to the United States to lead the company's US expansion. Over the next 15 years, Pratt Industries grew 15-fold in sales and earnings, through greenfield initiatives and the acquisition of several corrugated manufacturing companies that now form the heart of Pratt Industries. Company revenues grew from 100 million in 1991; and by 2016 revenue was 3 billion. During that time, Pratt Industries grew from the 46th largest corrugated box producer in the U.S. to the 5th largest. It is the only major paper container board company that is 100 percent recycled.

Although Pratt remains Chairman of the American arm of the family's packaging business, he returned to Australia to take over as Executive Chairman of Visy following the death of his father, Richard, in 2009. Visy's corporate reputation index ranking went from No. 43 to No. 3 between 2009 and 2011. In 2013, then-New York City Mayor Michael Bloomberg presented Pratt with a proclamation declaring 17 September 2013, Pratt Industries Day. In 2016, Pratt was awarded the RISI North American Packaging CEO of the Year Award. That same year, Pratt opened a 100% recycled paper mill near Chicago, adding about 1 billion to his wealth. It was officially opened by then-Governor Mike Pence. In March 2017, Pratt opened his 68th factory, a box-making plant, with Wisconsin Governor Scott Walker in Beloit. On 4 May 2017, Pratt pledged in the presence of President Donald Trump to invest $2 billion to create 5,000 high-paying manufacturing jobs over 10 years mainly in the Midwest. In August 2017, in the presence of Australian Prime Minister Malcolm Turnbull, Pratt made a further investment pledge of A$2 billion in Visy Australia to create 5,000 Australian manufacturing jobs. That same week Pratt, pledged to give away A$1 billion to charity before he dies. In 2020, Pratt was named “Executive Papermaker of the Year” by leading industry publication PaperAge for his strong leadership and corporate vision.

In July 2020, Anthony Pratt was named North American CEO of the Year by Fastmarkets RISI. Also in 2020, Pratt completed one of the biggest Australian manufacturing deals ever - buying the Australian assets of Owens Illinois for $1 billion to become Australia's largest glass bottle manufacturer. Then in February 2021, in the presence of Australian Prime Minister Scott Morrison, Pratt pledged to invest an additional $2 billion to increase the recycled content of Australian glass bottles from 30% to 70% and to build more clean energy plants as part of the goal to halve landfills and double the recycled content of manufactured products.

In July 2021, one year after the Owens Illinois acquisition, Pratt announced his largest-ever deal in America – a new $500 million paper mill in Henderson, Kentucky. Upon completion it will mean Pratt has built 6 of the last 8 paper mills in the USA - all 100% recycled. Pratt's two companies now employ 17,000 in America and Australia. In September, 2021, The Jerusalem Post named him 35th on its list of the world's 50 Most Influential Jews of 2021. In November 2021, Pratt and Pennsylvania governor Tom Wolf opened Pratt's new $150 million state-of-the-art box factory in Carlisle.

Pratt also welcomed two other US governors to his factories in the Fall of 2022. In September, Louisiana Governor John Bell Edwards visited Pratt’s 100% recycled paper mill in Shreveport to celebrate the businessman’s $250m of total investment in the state. 

A few weeks later, Kansas Governor Laura Kelly officially opened his new $200m corrugated box factory in Wichita.

Pratt Industries is now the 18th largest privately owned manufacturing company in the United States. 

And in his native Australia, Pratt attended the national Jobs and Skills Summit convened by the New Labour Government in September, 2022. Pratt, one of 100 government, business and social leaders invited to the conference, spoke about the need to reduce landfills and methane emissions though investment in technology.  

Then, the following month he broke ground on his Australian company’s largest ever single investment - a $500m glass recycling factory outside Brisbane, Qld.

In November, 2022, Pratt made his largest ever investment pledge. The $5 billion pledge, which he made to Caroline Kennedy, the US Ambassador to Australia, will be invested in recycling and clean energy infrastructure to create 5,000 well-paying, green collar, American manufacturing jobs over the next 10-years.

Personal life
Pratt sits on the National Board of the Muhammad Ali Center in Louisville, Kentucky, and is also active in charity organizations throughout Australia and the United States. In 1998, he arranged for Muhammad Ali to visit Australia for the Australian Football League grand final, as well as for a subsequent trip two years later. More recently, on what would have been Ali's 80th birthday, Pratt donated $2 million to the Ali Center to further promote Ali's legacy. Pratt is a member of the Climate Group, an international environmental group founded by former British prime minister Tony Blair. He has been honoured for his efforts by Mikhail Gorbachev's Global Green USA and Ted Turner's Captain Planet Foundation. Pratt is a member of the United States Studies Centre at the University of Sydney.

In 2007, Pratt committed to former President Clinton's Global Initiative to invest more than 1 billion over the ensuing decade in recycling infrastructure and clean energy. He fulfilled his pledge five years early. In 2009, Pratt was honored by the New York-based Foreign Policy Association with its Corporate Social Responsibility Award.

Since taking over the company, Pratt has taken a strong interest in sustainable agriculture, food security, and water issues, stating that his motivation is 70% of his Australian customers are in the food and beverage sector.

In April 2013, Pratt gave the keynote address at the Global Food Forum, an international conference on food security, which he organized in partnership with The Australian newspaper. He said it was possible for Australia to quadruple its current food production, through greater support for farmers and food companies, and to eventually feed 200 million people. The conference attracted leading political, agribusiness, food-industry, and academic figures. In October 2016, Pratt was the founding sponsor of The Wall Street Journal'''s inaugural U.S.-based Global Food Forum. In his opening remarks, Pratt called on food industry leaders to start a national conversation about how to double the size of the American food industry to US$1.8 trillion and thereby create millions of new jobs under the slogan "Export Food, Not Jobs". At subsequent Global Food Forum dinners during 2017 in Los Angeles and Chicago, Pratt continued to advocate for increased U.S. food exports.

In September 2013, Pratt was elected an executive member of the Australia-Japan Business Cooperation Committee, a group dedicated for more than 50 years to strengthening ties between the two countries. In October 2013, Prime Minister Tony Abbott invited Pratt on an official visit to Indonesia – the first overseas trip by the incoming leader. Later that month, Pratt announced that former advisor to President Obama and the outgoing US Ambassador to Australia, Jeffrey Bleich, would join the Pratt Group advisory board.

In 2013, Pratt was awarded an honorary PhD by Monash University, for an "outstanding career of achievement and service to philanthropy, business and commerce."

He is also a member of the Australian-American Leadership Dialogue, which seeks to strengthen and deepen the ties between Australian and American leaders.

In November 2021, Pratt funded the establishment of The Australia Chair at the Center for Strategic and International Studies (CSIS) to further promote ties between the two countries.

In 2017, Anthony Pratt attended Vice President Mike Pence's business roundtable at the Vice President's official residence in Washington D.C. Also in 2017, Anthony Pratt became a member of Mar-a-Lago, President Trump's private Florida club.

In 2017, Pratt launched the Superfund Roundtable in partnership with the Australian Financial Review. The annual event attracts some of the nation's leading business executives and financiers and is aimed at increasing superfund lending to Australian businesses to drive economic growth and create jobs. The Australian treasurer Jim Chalmers was the guest speaker at the most recent roundtable in August 2022. 

Earlier that year, Pratt was made an honorary Kentucky Colonel by Gov Beshear.

Then in October, Pratt gave the opening address at the inaugural New York Times New Climate Conference in San Francisco.  He was founding sponsor of the event.

That same year, Pratt also founded the inaugural Recycling Roundtable in partnership with the Sydney Morning Herald. Its goals are to halve Australian landfills by 2030 through increased recycling and thereby reduce pressure on natural resources.

The second SMH Recycling Roundtable, held in February, 2023, attracted leaders of some of Australia’s biggest companies as well as the Federal Minister for The Environment & Water Tanya Plibersek.

A week earlier Pratt also hosted the second annual Australian food and beverage manufacturing gala dinner in Sydney with the Prime Minister Anthony Albanese and special guest entertainer Keith Urban.

That same month Pratt Industries was honored to be included in the Annual Green List published by The Australian newspaper, which salutes the nation’s most sustainable companies.
“This article outlines what we stand for and our vision for the future,” said Pratt. 

Pratt and his family split time between New York City and Melbourne. Pratt is Jewish.

Net worth
Pratt first appeared on the Financial Review (AFR) Rich List in 2009 (then published as the BRW Rich 200, following the death of his father earlier that year. He debuted as the richest person in Australia with a net worth of 4.3 billion. In subsequent years, his wealth increased; however, those with interests in the then rapidly growing Australian resources sector came to dominate the list. Since 2009, the AFR Rich List and the Forbes list of Australia's 50 Richest People generally assessed Pratt's net worth on a similar basis, aggregated with his family. However, in 2015, Forbes reported the wealth of Pratt separate to the net worth of his two sisters, Fiona Geminder and Heloise Waislitz.

In 2022, The Australian newspaper assessed his worth at A$27.7billion. Several months earlier, in February 2021, Bloomberg News ranked him seventh in the list of the world's richest people to have made their fortunes from green industries. They valued his personal worth at US$12 billion.

In 2016, the Australian Taxation Office revealed that despite more than 2.5 billion in revenue in 2013–14, Pratt Consolidated Holdings had not paid any taxes. In response, Pratt said, "All I can say is that we abide by all the laws, as any good ethical company does."

Philanthropy
Pratt is head of the Pratt Foundation, which has donated hundreds of millions of dollars since it was established and continues to give approximately 20 million per year, including to Planned Parenthood, The Urban League, St Jude's Hospital and many others. Pratt also serves on the board of trustees of the Appeal of Conscience Foundation. Pratt is patron of the Trilateral Track II Food and Water Security Dialogue which he launched with former Israeli Prime Minister Shimon Peres between India, Israel and Australia. Pratt is a patron of the Australia India Leadership Dialogue, and founding patron of The Prince's Charities Australia. In 2017, Pratt hosted a Food waste Summit at his Melbourne home aimed at halving Australia's food waste by 2030. Also in 2017, he was executive producer and guest conductor at a fundraising gala concert for the Melbourne Symphony Orchestra.

In December 2021, in the wake of the tornado that devastated parts of Kentucky, Pratt donated $1 million to the state's storm relief fund and a further $1 million to the Tri-State Food Bank to help those in need.

Pratt’s dedication to food security was further demonstrated in October, 2022, when he donated $1 million to Feeding America, the nation’s largest hunger relief organization. The money will provide more than 10 million meals.

References

External links
Pratt Industries
Eulogy delivered at the memorial service for his father, Richard Pratt (streaming video)The Sydney Morning Herald'', 30 April 2009.

1960 births
Living people
Australian billionaires
Australian chief executives
Australian Jews
Australian people of Polish-Jewish descent
Businesspeople from Melbourne
Monash University alumni
Australian expatriates in the United States